Maltby Strong (November 24, 1796 – August 5, 1878) was an American physician, businessman, and mayor of Rochester, New York.

Strong, fourth son of Rev. Joseph Strong and Sophia (Woodbridge) Strong, was born in Heath, Mass., November 24, 1796, his father being then settled over the church in that town.  He graduated from Yale College in 1819.  (Two of his elder brothers were graduated Yale in 1812 and 1815.) After leaving college he attended a course of lectures at the Yale Medical School, and then entered the office of his brother, Dr. Woodbridge Strong, of Boston, as a student, and attended two courses of lectures at Harvard University. In 1822, he accompanied Dr. Nathan Smith, the head of the Yale Medical School to Brunswick, Me., as private pupil and surgical assistant in a course of lectures, and while there received the degree of M.D. from Bowdoin College. He then began the practice of medicine in South Hadley, and pursued it with success for several years.  In 1831 he removed to Rochester, N. Y., where he continued to practice his profession. In 1832 he engaged in the business of milling flour in connection with his eldest brother, Hon. Joseph Strong. This business, and other employments, such as the purchase and sale of real estate, engrossed his attention for some years, to the exclusion of his profession; but he subsequently resumed practice, and did not finally relinquish it until about ten years before his death. In 1854 he was elected Mayor of the city, and held the office for one term. He was intelligently interested in all public affairs, and especially in the improvement of the educational privileges of Rochester.

He was married, September 9, 1835, to Eliza B., daughter of Joseph E. Sprague, of Salem, Mass., who survived him, without children. He died in Rochester, August 5, 1878, in his 82nd year.

1796 births
1878 deaths
People from Heath, Massachusetts
Mayors of Rochester, New York
Yale School of Medicine alumni
Harvard Medical School alumni
Bowdoin College alumni
19th-century American politicians
Yale College alumni